Jacob Henry Eason (born November 17, 1997) is an American football quarterback for the Carolina Panthers of the National Football League (NFL). He played college football at Washington and Georgia and was drafted by the Indianapolis Colts in the fourth round of the 2020 NFL Draft.

Eason attended Lake Stevens High School in Lake Stevens, Washington, and was rated by Rivals as a five-star recruit. He was ranked as the best pro-style quarterback and best player overall in the 2016 class. Eason committed to the University of Georgia to play college football on July 19, 2014. He transferred to the University of Washington in 2018, though he had to sit out the 2018 season because of NCAA transfer eligibility rules. After starting in 2019, Eason decided to forgo his senior season at the University of Washington and enter the NFL Draft.

Early life and high school career
Eason was born to Tony and Christine Eason and was raised in Lake Stevens, Washington. His father, Tony Eason, played college football at the University of Notre Dame, but he should not be confused with quarterback Tony Eason who played college football at the University of Illinois and later for the New England Patriots in the 1980s.

As a freshman at Lake Stevens High School, Jacob played in four games and completed 21 of 50 pass attempts (42%) for 458 yards, four touchdowns, and one interception. The following year, he played in ten games and threw 350 passes, completing 209 (59.7%) of them for 2,941 passing yards, 23 touchdowns, and eight interceptions. In 2014, he played in all 11 games for Lake Stevens and led them to a 9–2 record. He finished his junior year completing 197 of 287 passes (68.6%) for 2,829 yards, 32 touchdowns and only three interceptions. Rival's named him their Junior of the Year in 2014. During his last season at Lake Stevens, he played in 13 games, completed 235-of-338 (69.5%) pass attempts for 3,585 yards, 43 touchdowns and six interceptions. In his senior season he led them to a 12–1 record and took them all the way to the state semifinals against Skyline but ended up losing 34–37. He finished his career at Lake Stevens completing 662 out of 1,025 pass attempts for 9,813 passing yards, 102 touchdown passes and 18 interceptions, while appearing in a total of 38 games. He was ranked as the best pro-style quarterback and best player overall in the 2016 class.

Recruiting
He was rated a five-star recruit by Rivals, 247sports, and Scout. Rivals had Eason ranked as the top quarterback in the nation and as the 7th top prospect in the nation. Eason was a highly sought after recruit, receiving offers from Florida, Miami, Alabama, Colorado, Florida State, Michigan, Notre Dame, Oklahoma, Oklahoma State, among many others. On July 20, 2014, he committed to the University of Georgia.

College career

Georgia
Eason enrolled early at Georgia during the spring of 2016. Although he was not named the starter going into season opener, he came in for Georgia's fourth possession against North Carolina for senior Greyson Lambert and subsequently completed 8 of 12 passes for 131 passing yards and threw his first career collegiate touchdown. #18 Georgia went on to defeat #22 North Carolina 33–24. The following week, Eason earned his first career start against Nicholls State and finished completing 11 of 20 passes for 204 yards and a touchdown. Eason then led Georgia to a comeback victory over Missouri after he threw the game-winning touchdown on 4th and 10 to Isaiah McKenzie with only 1:29 left in the game. He finished the game with 29/55 pass attempts for 309 passing yards, 3 touchdowns, and one interception. On September 24, 2016, #12 Georgia suffered their first loss to #23 Ole Miss with Eason completing only 16 of 36 pass attempts for 137 passing yards and one interception. On October 15, 2016, Eason threw for 346 passing yards and completed 27 out of 40 pass attempts in Georgia's 16–17 loss to Vanderbilt. On November 12, 2016, he helped Georgia defeat #9 Auburn after completing 20/31 pass attempts for 208 yards.

Eason began the 2017 season as Georgia's starting quarterback. In the first game of the season against Appalachian State, Eason injured his knee on a late hit out of bounds. Freshman Jake Fromm, the highly recruited back-up quarterback, became the starter during Eason's absence. Fromm remained the starter even after Eason's recovery, and led the Bulldogs to the 2018 College Football Playoff National Championship game.

Washington
Following the 2017 season, Eason announced he would leave Georgia. The decision was widely anticipated, as Eason had lost the starting job at Georgia to Fromm. On January 9, the Seattle Times reported that Eason planned to transfer to the University of Washington, which would require that he sit out the 2018 season. The transfer was officially announced on February 6.

Eason won the starting job for the 2019 season. In his first start for the Huskies against Eastern Washington, he completed 27 of 36 passes for 349 yards and four touchdowns as Washington won 47–14. On December 26, 2019, Eason announced that he would forgo his senior year and enter the 2020 NFL Draft.

College statistics

Professional career

Indianapolis Colts
Eason was drafted by the Indianapolis Colts with the 122nd overall pick in the fourth round of the 2020 NFL Draft. In 2020, he served as the third-string quarterback, behind starter Philip Rivers and backup Jacoby Brissett. He did not play during his rookie season.

With the retirement of Rivers, the departure of Brissett, and the arrival of Carson Wentz, Eason came into the 2021 season competing for the backup position with rookie Sam Ehlinger; Eason eventually won the role. He made his NFL debut in Week 2 of the 2021 season, appearing in relief of Wentz, who was injured toward the end of the game against the Los Angeles Rams. He completed two out of five passes for 25 yards and one interception. On October 19, 2021, Eason was waived by the Colts.

Seattle Seahawks
On October 20, 2021, the Seattle Seahawks claimed Eason off waivers. He was waived on August 30, 2022.

Carolina Panthers
On August 31, 2022, Eason was signed to the Carolina Panthers practice squad.  He was elevated to the active roster on October 12, 2022, after Baker Mayfield suffered an injury.

He appeared in relief of P. J. Walker in Week 6 against the Los Angeles Rams and went 3-for-5 for 59 yards and an interception. He returned to the practice squad following the game. He was released on November 7, 2022.

San Francisco 49ers 
On November 14, 2022, he worked out with the San Francisco 49ers, signing with the team's practice squad the next day. He was released on January 3, 2023.

Carolina Panthers (second stint)
On January 24, 2023, Eason signed a reserve/future deal with the Carolina Panthers.

NFL career statistics

References

External links
 
 Indianapolis Colts bio
 Georgia Bulldogs bio
 Washington Huskies bio

1997 births
Living people
People from Lake Stevens, Washington
Players of American football from Washington (state)
Sportspeople from the Seattle metropolitan area
American football quarterbacks
Georgia Bulldogs football players
Washington Huskies football players
Indianapolis Colts players
Seattle Seahawks players
Carolina Panthers players
San Francisco 49ers players